NA-23 Mardan-III is a constituency for the National Assembly of Pakistan. The constituency was formerly known as NA-10 (Mardan-II) from 1977 to 2018. The name changed to NA-22 (Mardan-III) after the delimitation in 2018 and to NA-23 (Mardan-III) after the delimitation in 2022.

Members of Parliament

1977–2002: NA-10 Mardan-II

2002–2018: NA-9 Mardan-II

2018-2022: NA-22 Mardan-III

Elections since 2002

2002 general election

A total of 1,713 votes were rejected.

2008 general election

A total of 2,928 votes were rejected.

2013 general election

A total of 4,834 votes were rejected.

2018 general election 

General elections were held on 25 July 2018.

†JUI-F, and JI contested as part of MMA

2022 by-election 
A by-election was held on 16 October 2022 due to the resignation of Ali Muhammad Khan, the previous MNA from this seat.

†JUI-F, and JI previously contested jointly as part of MMA

2023 by-election 
A by-election will be held on 30 April 2023 due to the vacation of this seat by Imran Khan, who won it in the 2022 by-election.

See also
NA-22 Mardan-II
NA-24 Charsadda-I

References

External links 
 Election result's official website

22
22